Jari Poutiainen (born 29 August 1966) is a retired Finnish football goalkeeper.

References 

1966 births
Living people
Finnish footballers
Koparit players
Kuopion Palloseura players
Hammarby Fotboll players
Syrianska FC players
Finland international footballers
Association football goalkeepers
Finnish expatriate footballers
Expatriate footballers in Sweden
Finnish expatriate sportspeople in Sweden
Veikkausliiga players
Allsvenskan players
Superettan players
Ettan Fotboll players